Chris Hughes is a British tabloid journalist and author best known for his reporting of the Iraq War and war in Afghanistan.
In 2013 he received Specialist Journalist of the Year Award in recognition for his work as a defense correspondent

Career
Since 1994 Hughes has been working as security correspondent for the Daily Mirror, specialising in conflict-zone reporting with particular emphasis on Middle Eastern conflicts, global terrorism and war, and has spent time covering the wars in Iraq and Afghanistan. His book, Road Trip to Hell, details his time with UK and American forces in the two countries.

War reporting
In 2001 Hughes  started reporting from Iraq and in 2006 he covered Israel–Lebanon war from Beirut. In 2016 Hughes started reporting about a military coup in Turkey. In 2017 he was reporting from the frontline in the battle to liberate Mosul from the Islamic State, from the beginning of the campaign and from within Mosul as ISIL were defeated. In September 2017 his exclusive story about North Korean leader Kim Jong-un appeared on the front-page of the Daily Mirror newspaper.

Publications
In his book Road Trip to Hell Hughes mentioned he was the first Western reporter to enter Iraq after the September 11, 2001 attacks on America, and the first Western journalist to access Saddam Hussein's bunker. He also claims to have witnessed unarmed demonstrators killed and wounded in Fallujah by US Marines. In 2009 Hughes co-authored Attack State Red, an account of the 2007 campaign undertaken by the Royal Anglian Regiment, documenting their initial deployment and trials in Afghanistan.

Awards
In 2013 Hughes was awarded Specialist Journalist of the Year Award in recognition for his work as a specialist war correspondent.

See also

 Investigative journalism
 War reporting

References

External links
 Daily Mirror news team Chris Hughes and James Vellacott travel to the front line in Afghanistan
 Daily Mirror - Chris Hughes

British male journalists
Year of birth missing (living people)
Living people
British war correspondents
English war correspondents
Journalists from London
English reporters and correspondents
British investigative journalists
British memoirists
War correspondents of the Iraq War
21st-century British novelists
English male non-fiction writers
21st-century English male writers
21st-century memoirists